D. floribunda may refer to:

 Dactyladenia floribunda, a plant native to Africa
 Dalbergia floribunda, a flowering plant
 Dasiphora floribunda, a deciduous shrub
 Delonix floribunda, a legume endemic to Madagascar
 Delosperma floribunda, a succulent plant
 Dillwynia floribunda, a bushy shrub
 Dioscorea floribunda, a diosgenin-rich yam
 Dipelta floribunda, a deciduous shrub
 Diphysa floribunda, a flowering plant
 Dracaena floribunda, a lilioid monocot
 Drimia floribunda, a perennial plant
 Dryandra floribunda, a plant with prickly dark green leaves
 Dyckia floribunda, a plant with stiff and thorny leaves